Chamber of Horrors is a 1929 British silent horror film directed by Walter Summers and starring Frank Stanmore and Elizabeth Hempel. It was made at Welwyn Studios. Film historians consider this movie the last major silent film made in England.

Plot
James Budgeforth (Frank Stanmore) spends the night in the Chamber of Horrors of Madame Tussauds. While there, he has a nightmare in which he murders his mistress Ninette (Elizabeth Hempel), and believing the dream to be real, he loses his sanity during the night.

Cast
 Frank Stanmore as James Budgeforth  
 Elizabeth Hempel as Ninette  
 Leslie Holland as deaf mute
 Joan Maude as lady reporter
 Fanny Wright as lecturer

References

Bibliography
 Wood, Linda. British Films, 1927-1939. British Film Institute, 1986.

External links

1929 films
British horror films
British silent feature films
1929 horror films
1920s English-language films
Films directed by Walter Summers
Films shot at Welwyn Studios
Films set in London
British black-and-white films
Silent horror films
1920s British films